Första Kärleken is a 1992 Swedish television miniseries created by Leif Magnusson. Starring Linus Åberg, Alexandra Royal and Christopher Luschan. It's loosely based on Hjärtans Fröjd, a novel by Per Nilsson, about a boy who fell in love with a girl.

Plot 
Daniel Andersson looks forward to yet another exciting summer together with his friend Anders, but this year he'll be spending most of his time with someone else. Anna, who is deaf, has moved in with her parents in the cottage next door. One day, while Daniel is swimming in a nearby lake, Anna shows up unexpectedly, and the two hit it off immediately. Before long, their friendship develops into a romance. Little do they know, local bad boy Jesper has been spying on them swimming, and Anna has caught his eye. When Jesper tries to move in on Anna, trouble ensues.

Cast

Main 
 Linus Åberg as Daniel
 Alexandra Royal as Anna
 Johan Lilja as Anders
 Christopher Luschan as Jesper
 Jimmy Sandin as Patrik
 Hans Mosesson as Daniel's Father
 Ewa Carlsson as Daniel's Mother

Recurring 
 Anders Ahlbom as Benny
 Barbro Kollberg as Clara
 Bergljót Arnadóttir as Ann-Britt
 Gustav Elander as Bengt
 Lars Green as Jesper's Father
 Anna Lindholm as Linda
 Nadia Saleh as Maria
 Pia Oscarsson as Lena
 Susanne Barklund as Jenny
 Nicke Wagemyr as Pelle
 Ulla Akselsson as Cashier
 Dan Johansson as Officer

Episodes

Release 
The series was released on video cassette and is available in streaming.

References

External links 
 
 

1992 Swedish television series debuts
1992 Swedish television series endings
Television shows based on Swedish novels
Swedish television miniseries
1990s Swedish television series